Streptomyces sparsus is a bacterium species from the genus of Streptomyces which has been isolated from saline and alkaline soil in the Qinghai Province in China.

See also 
 List of Streptomyces species

References

Further reading

External links
Type strain of Streptomyces sparsus at BacDive -  the Bacterial Diversity Metadatabase

sparsus
Bacteria described in 2011